City College of San Francisco (CCSF or City College) is a public community college in San Francisco, California. Founded as a junior college in 1935, the college plays an important local role, annually enrolling as many as one in nine San Francisco residents. CCSF is accredited by the Accrediting Commission for Community and Junior Colleges (ACCJC).

Comprising the entire San Francisco Community College District, CCSF is the only community college in San Francisco. The Ocean Avenue campus, bordering the Sunnyside, Westwood Park and Ingleside neighborhoods, is the college's largest location. The college has other campuses in South San Francisco, Financial District, Little Saigon, South of Market, Bayview-Hunters Point, Marina District, North of Panhandle, and Mission District.

CCSF offers courses in more than 50 academic programs and over 100 occupational disciplines. There is a wide selection of credit courses that lead to an associate degree, which can be used to meet the general education requirements for transfer to four-year institutions. City College of San Francisco has articulation agreements with the California State University system, the University of California system, and other private and public universities in California and across the United States. Free non-credit courses in subjects such as ESL and citizenship as well as adult education classes are also provided.

History

San Francisco Junior College
The founding of a junior college in San Francisco had long been the dream of Archibald Jeter Cloud, the Chief Deputy Superintendent of the San Francisco Unified School District (SFUSD). In response to Black Tuesday and the ensuing Great Depression, Cloud worked to convince the San Francisco Board of Education of the necessity of a junior college in Depression-era San Francisco and of the District's financial ability to form one. Cloud's presentation of fiscal studies in 1934 convinced the Board of the availability of Federal and State funding for a junior college. City College of San Francisco was established by the Board of Education of the San Francisco Unified School District on February 15, 1934, and officially opened on August 26, 1935, as San Francisco Junior College. The college had no central campus at the time. Instruction began on September 4, 1935, with morning classes held at the University of California Extension building on Powell Street and afternoon classes held at Galileo High School. The long distance between the two locations gave the college the nickname "Trolley Car College." Increasing enrollment gave way to the college's expansion to Lick-Wilmerding High School, Samuel Gompers Trade School, Marina Junior High School, and other locations. A permanent main campus near Ocean Avenue was approved by the San Francisco Board of Education in 1937 and opened in 1940 with the opening of Science Hall.

City College of San Francisco

In February 1948, the name was changed to City College of San Francisco. It now consists of eleven campuses, the Ocean Campus being the primary one.

In 1970, the college separated from the San Francisco Unified School District. The college continued to hold noncredit education programs throughout San Francisco's neighborhoods. However, as a result of CCSF's rapid growth, the San Francisco Community College District divided the programs between a division for credit courses at the Ocean Campus and one other division for noncredit courses throughout locations in San Francisco. The two educational divisions merged as a single division in 1990 with program locations held at campuses of City College of San Francisco.

Since the 1990s, the college has significantly renovated and expanded its locations and developed new buildings and facilities throughout San Francisco.

Since its founding in 1935, City College has evolved into a multicultural, multi-campus community college that is one of the largest in the country. CCSF offers courses in more than 50 academic programs and over 100 occupational disciplines. There is a full range of credit courses leading to the Associate of Arts and Associate of Science degrees, most of which meet the general education requirements for transfer to a four-year colleges and universities.

Accreditation crisis
In 2012, the college began experiencing significant public turmoil. On July 2, 2012, the Accrediting Commission for Community and Junior Colleges (ACCJC), gave the college eight months to prove it should remain accredited and ordered it to "make preparations for closure". As summarized by the San Francisco Chronicle in 2015, "the commission has never found wrongdoing or substandard instruction, but has said the college should lose accreditation because of tangled governance structures, poor fiscal controls and insufficient self-evaluation and reporting." In September 2012, the state chancellor's office warned that a special trustee would be appointed to oversee the institution's finances if the college did not voluntarily invite one; the board of trustees voted to invite a special trustee, despite student protests and objection. A report issued by California's Fiscal Crisis & Management Assistance team in September 2012 found the institution to be in a "perilous financial position" caused largely by "poor decisions and a lack of accountability.

In July 2013, the ACCJC elected to take action to terminate the college's accreditation, subject to a one-year review and appeal period. The decision was based on a variety of deficiencies in standards. A Fiscal Crisis and Management Assistance Team report was expected to be released by the end of July 2013. Nearly two months later, San Francisco city attorney Dennis Herrera filed two legal challenges to stop the ACCJC from revoking City College of San Francisco's accreditation alleging conflicts of interest, a faulty evaluation process, and a politically motivated decision-making process. The 2013 decision to revoke accreditation in 2014 was put on hold pending the legal challenges. In January 2015, with the legal conflict still ongoing, ACCJC said that CCSF remained out of compliance with standards in 32 areas but granted the college a two-year extension for resolving these issues and avoiding a shutdown.

In 2017, ACCJC reaffirmed the college's accreditation for seven years. It operates with approximately $22M annual Stabilization funding from the California legislature which will expire in 2021. For the 2017/18 Fiscal year, the Board of Trustees approved a $49M Deficit budget.

Free City College 
After the accreditation crisis in 2012, CCSF was having low student enrollment issues. In the years that followed the crisis, student enrollment went from 90,000 students down to 60,000 students by 2017. In February 2017, the City of San Francisco began offering free tuition at CCSF for San Francisco city residents in a two year pilot program called “Free City College”. The money for the free tuition was raised from Proposition W, a transfer of properties tax on property sold over $5 million. By Fall 2017, student enrollment was increased by 16% (4,900 students). However, a financial audit in 2019 showed that the college was still in dire straits with deficits for at least three years and nearly $14 million more in spending than revenue during the previous fiscal year.

Organization and administration
CCSF is part of the San Francisco Community College District which is independent and co-extensive with the City and County of San Francisco and part of the California Community Colleges System. The district's board of trustees is elected by San Francisco residents. District funds are allocated from the state legislature, local property taxes, student tuition and fees, lottery funds, sales tax funds, and miscellaneous sources.

Unique to California Community Colleges, CCSF support staff are pooled in the County of San Francisco's Civil Service system, so they may transfer between the community college and other City/County of San Francisco departments and participate in the City and County's benefit programs. This is an exception to academic independence enabled by Education Code section 88137. College administrators do not have control of the hiring and placement of classified staff. Although it allows for benefit and seniority portability, CCSF classified staff are not paid at the same rate as their equivalent in other cities/county departments, so transfer to the college is effectively a demotion.

City College of San Francisco is located in an urban environment and has the associated crime rate. All campuses are maintained by the San Francisco Community College District Police Department (SFCCDPD). The SFCCDPD has twenty eight police officers and nine civilian employees.

Although most colleges and universities have auxiliary foundations for fundraising, the foundation of City College's assets were frozen in 2010 for illegal use, leading to felony money laundering charges against the college's chancellor. The Foundation subsequently made a break from the college, and today, the college has a quasi-endowment of a little over $1M that it does not control.

Campus and academic centers

CCSF officially opened in 1935, during the Depression era, at the Industrial school, a school for juvenile delinquents, at the Ocean/Phelan Avenue site. Instruction began on September 4, 1935, with morning classes held at the University of California Extension Division building on Powell Street and afternoon classes at Galileo High School with students moving between sites using the trolley system at the time. As the student population grew, classes became available at other sites across San Francisco at a variety of sites. As Juila Bergman writes in the book City College of San Francisco, "Thus, in a real sense, the history of the college is a history of San Francisco and its transportation system."

Today it has a main campus (called Ocean Campus) but it also has 10 other satellite locations across San Francisco. Commonly called "campuses," but recently renamed as "centers," these are technically "Academic Centers" and "outreach Operations" in the state-approved framework of the California Community Colleges System, having less than the range of educational facilities and services offered at a typical community college campus.

Active campuses 
 Airport Center, San Francisco International Airport, Bldg. 928
 Chinatown/North Beach Center, 808 Kearny Street
 Downtown Center, 88 4th Street
 Evans Center, 1400 Evans Avenue
 John Adams Center, 1860 Hayes Street
 Mission Center, 1125 Valencia Street
 Ocean Campus, 50 Frida Kahlo Way (main campus)
 Southeast Center, 1800 Oakdale Avenue.

Former campuses 
 Civic Center, 1170 Market Street
 Fort Mason Center, Fort Mason Center, 1934-Bldg. B
 Gough Street Site, 31–33 Gough Street (administration)

The Airport Center is not state approved and has never been state approved, and the other centers are grandfathered but would not be permitted to open under the 2012 California Community College guidelines.

Art on campus
Most of the early art on CCSF campus was due to the work of Timothy L. Pflueger, the architect who was in charge of designing CCSF in the 1930s. Pflueger was on a committee of well-known Beaux-Arts architects organizing and designing the Golden Gate International Exposition (GGIE) and he put together a large exhibit of Art in Action in 1940, showcasing a number of artists (from various genres) on display, engaged in creating works. Many of these artworks from GGIE now permanently live at CCSF's Ocean Campus.

Diego Rivera 

Diego Rivera's work Pan American Unity, originally created for the Golden Gate International Exposition in 1940, has been displayed at the theater at the Ocean Campus of San Francisco City College since 1961. This large mural stands, 22' high and 74' long made up of 5 panels. The mural was entitled by Rivera, “Unión de la Expresión Artistica del Norte y Sur de este Continente” (The Marriage of the Artistic Expression of the North and South of this Continent) but now commonly called Pan American Unity. There are three self-portraits and a portrait on his wife, artist Frida Kahlo within this mural. As of 2014, City College is in the process of supporting The Diego Rivera Mural Project, with goals to return the mural to the position of public importance, stabilize the environment in which it is set, and secure funding to make the project self supportive.

Frederick E. Olmsted 

Frederick E. Olmsted's 1941 Theory and Science mural is located at CCSF's Ocean Campus in the Science Hall's west entrance. This is two 12′ x 8′ tempera fresco murals and depicts a range of careers in the sciences, featuring men, women and people of color doing things such as viewing bacteria through a microscope, conducting field research, and excavating dinosaur remains. Olmsted also created two large, limestone sculptures of Leonardo da Vinci and Thomas Edison heads that are on display in the Ocean Campus middle courtyard. The giant Leonardo da Vinci and Thomas Edison heads were created in 1940 as part of the Golden Gate International Exposition's Art in Action exhibition and later given to CCSF for care and display.

Beniamino Bufano 
Beniamino Bufano was a California-based Italian American sculptor, best known for his large-scale monuments representing peace. Bufano's sculpture Saint Francis of the Guns of 1968 stands at San Francisco City College in front of the Science Building. It is a statue of Saint Francis of Assisi—San Francisco's namesake—made from melted-down guns mixed with bronze to prevent rust from the city's dampness; this work was inspired by that year's assassinations of Martin Luther King Jr. and Robert F. Kennedy. The sculpture is of a 9-ft tall figure of a robed Catholic saint, his arms spread in peaceful greeting. On his robe, Bufano created a mosaic tile mural showing the glowing heads of four of America's assassinated leaders: Abraham Lincoln, Martin Luther King Jr., Robert Kennedy and John F. Kennedy. This was one of Bufano's last works before he died.

Dudley C. Carter 
Dudley C. Carter has three works at the CCSF Ocean Campus, including The Ram sometimes called Mountain Ram, Goddess of the Forest, and The Beast sculptures. Dudley had donated The Ram because he knew it was the school mascot and it had been part of the Golden Gate International Exposition's Arts in Action exhibition. The Ram sculpture stood outside on the campus periodically changing locations from time to time, students would coat it in paint with campus colors red and white. Sometimes rival schools would repaint The Ram in their own school colors. By 1980 The Ram had many layers of paint and damage and in Spring of 1983 it was restored by Carter with use of a pick axe and its original, natural redwood. Currently located in the lobby of Conlan Hall, on the Ocean Campus. The Goddess of the Forest is another redwood sculpture created during GGIE, it is very large standing at 26 feet tall and had a girth at the base of 21 feet. For years this piece was located at Golden Gate Park, until 1986 when it began to show distress and decay. It was then moved to CCSF to an indoor location awaiting restoration.

Ignacio Perez Solano 
In 2004, the then-Governor of Veracruz, Mexico, Miguel Alemán Velazco, presented CCSF with a reproduction of an Olmec colossal head in honor of the new Pan-American Center. The gift, a 14-ton, 9-foot tall replica of “El Rey” (The King) San Lorenzo #1 created in volcanic tuff is now the centerpiece of the proposed Frida Kahlo Garden next to the Diego Rivera Theater at City College of San Francisco. The artist who carved the replica was Ignacio Perez Solano, also known as “il Maestro.” This is only one of five Olmec head reproductions in the United States. The Olmecs are viewed by some as the "mother culture" of Mexico.

Herman Volz 
Two 50′ x 45′ low-relief polished marble mosaics by the Swiss-born artist Herman Volz are located in the south portico of San Francisco City College's Science Hall, located on Ocean Campus. The murals are named Organic and Inorganic Science. The imagery of the mosaics represent fields such as physics, chemistry, biology, and mathematics with text accompanying the mural that reads ‘Give me a base and I move the world.’ These murals were originally part of the Golden Gate International Exposition’s Art in Action show in 1940 on Treasure Island before they were moved to the college. The two mosaics took two years to install with a staff of eight workmen, Juan Breda served as assistant mosaicist for the project. The murals were restored in 2005.

Academics

City College of San Francisco has over 50 educational programs and more than 100 work training programs. CCSF has a transfer rate to four-year institutions of 60%, with 45.8% of transfer students transferring with an associate degree.

Schools
 School of Behavioral & Social Sciences and Multicultural Studies (12 departments)
 School of Business (5 departments)
 School of English & Foreign Languages
 School of Fine, Applied, and Communication Arts (10 departments)
 School of Health, PE, & Social Services (11 departments)
 School of ESL, International Education & Transitional Studies
 School of Science & Mathematics (13 departments)
 Library Information Technology

Hotel and restaurant management programs

Founded in 1936, the two-year hospitality program is the oldest of any kind on emphasizing culinary arts, with an annual average enrollment of 200 international students. This program offers culinary art, food service management, and hotel management.

The current facilities in Statler Wing are now home to a café (currently named Radius 99), cafeteria, and fine dining restaurant (Pierre Coste Room); four kitchens, a bake shop, three lecture rooms, a lecture/demonstration auditorium, the Alice Statler Library and Gifford Resource Center. The department has an ongoing enrollment of over 250 students from around the world.

Language programs
The school offers courses in nine languages with full courses including American Sign Language (Amsl), Chinese, French, German, Italian, Japanese, Russian, and Spanish. Degrees available for these language programs include an Associate of Arts degree (AA), an Associate of Arts for Transfer degree (AA-T) or a Certificate of Achievement in languages.

The school also offers Cantonese language classes. In December 2021 there were budget cuts which threatened the status of the program. Alan Wong, a member of the CCSF board, stated that since the Cantonese class does not result in a certificate, the class was in jeapordy. At least two "Save Cantonese" campaigns were created to save the language classes. Ultimately the school's Cantonese program remained.

Student life

Student Activities Office
The Student Activities Office provides resources, support and leadership training for eight Associated Students Councils and more than 80 clubs and student organizations.  It sponsors a wide variety of concerts and lectures throughout the year.  It funds the Book Loan Program, Dr. Betty Shabazz Family Resource Center, Multi-Cultural Resource Center, Queer Resource Center, Student Health, Students Supporting Students mentoring program, and Women's Resource Center. Performances given by students in music, dance, and theater arts further enhance campus life.

Students can also avail themselves of the Fitness Center, nationally ranked intercollegiate sports, and participate in the college's award-winning intercollegiate Speech and Debate Program.

Media
The college also features a student-run newspaper, The Guardsman, an award-winning magazine, ETC as well as television and radio stations.

The Free Critic, founded 1966, is the campus alternative paper.

LGBT community
Currently, there is a Queer Alliance student group and a Queer Resource Center on campus. The Queer Resource Center is an informational and  advocacy resource center for lesbian, gay, bisexual, transgender, gender queer, intersex, questioning, and straight allies. The Queer Resource Center aims to empower and celebrate its demographic as well as its community, part of which they have supported the addition of new queer studies classes and a new queer-focused associate degree in 2019. The center has participated in anti-violence, anti-homophobia, and anti-transphobia rallies and workshops. The center has struggled with funding although this has caught the attention of politicians, notably the Green Party, whose candidate for board of trustees John Rizzo promised in 2006 funds for more LGBT studies and the Queer Resource Center.

Women
On campus, there are numerous student activity groups, gender-specific courses, and health services. For example, the Women's Resource Center and Library (Smith Hall, 103–104) offers women on campus an opportunity to network with academic support services and resources, and Project Survive is a campus peer education group working to promote healthy relationships and end abuse and sexual violence.

Athletics

Teams
Intercollegiate athletics are offered for men and women. College teams belong in the CCCAA Coast Conference North Section and competes with teams from other colleges. Intercollegiate sports include baseball, basketball, cross-country, football, soccer, softball, tennis, track, badminton, volleyball, and judo. These teams are all nicknamed the after the mascot of the school, The Rams. City College of San Francisco Football Teams have won ten national championships. The annual rivalry football game is played against the College of San Mateo Football team.

Sports facilities
All of the CCSF Rams teams are based on the Ocean Campus. The home venue for baseball is Carter Field. Softball is played at Fairmont Park. Football as well as track and field use Rams Stadium. A new Soccer Practice Field has been built north of the stadium. The Wellness Center, south of Rams Stadium, houses staff offices, weight rooms, a swimming pool, lockrooms, classrooms, and an indoor gym. East of Rams Stadium used to be the former site of the North Gym and the South Gym, which used to contain the lockrooms, weight rooms, and staff offices. The Tennis Courts are across an access road from the former gyms.

Notable people

Alumni

This is a list of notable alumni from City College of San Francisco, listed in alphabetical order by last name.

Actors

Artists and designers

Sports professionals

Baseball

Basketball

Football

Journalists and writers

Politics and civil service

Other

Faculty

This is a list of notable faculty from City College of San Francisco, listed in alphabetical order by last name.

See also

 Art in Action, the art exhibition that donated most of the prominent art on-campus to CCSF's Ocean Campus
 Berkeley City College (BCC), a community college located in Berkeley
 California Community College Athletic Association (CCCAA)
 California Community Colleges system
 Cañada College, a community college located in Redwood City
 College of Marin, a community college located in Marin
 College of San Mateo, a community college located in San Mateo
 Laney College, a community college located in Oakland
 Merritt College, a community college located in Oakland
 Skyline College, a community college located in San Bruno

References

External links

 

 
Educational institutions established in 1935
Schools accredited by the Western Association of Schools and Colleges
1935 establishments in California
Chinatown, San Francisco
North Beach, San Francisco